The forty-fourth edition of the Caribbean Series (Serie del Caribe) was held from February 2 through February 8 of  with the champion baseball teams of the Dominican Republic, Tigres del Licey; Mexico, Tomateros de Culiacán; Puerto Rico, Vaqueros de Bayamón, and Venezuela, Navegantes del Magallanes. The format consisted of 12 games, each team facing the other teams twice, and the games were played at Estadio Universitario in Caracas, the capital city of Venezuela.

Final standings

Individual leaders

All-Star team

Sources
Bjarkman, Peter. Diamonds around the Globe: The Encyclopedia of International Baseball. Greenwood. 
Serie del Caribe : History, Records and Statistics (Spanish)

Caribbean
2002
International baseball competitions hosted by Venezuela
Sport in Puerto la Cruz
2002 in Venezuelan sport
2002 in Caribbean sport
Caribbean Series